Events from 2017 in England

Incumbent

Events
1 January – Kingston upon Hull begins its City of Culture programme with a 10-minute fireworks display over the Marina.
2 January
The government announces proposals to build seventeen new towns and villages across the English countryside.
Yassar Yaqub is killed in a police shooting during an operation on the M62 near Huddersfield.
9 January – Seven year old Katie Rough is fatally asphyxiated and stabbed in the neck near her home in Woodthorpe, York. A fifteen year old girl hands herself in to the police immediately after the killing.
14 March – Trans woman fell runner Lauren Jeska is sentenced to 18 years imprisonment for the attempted murder of UK Athletics official Ralph Knibbs. Jeska had feared her records and ability to compete in women's events would be investigated due to the unfair advantage she had from being born male.
3 June – Reynhard Sinaga, an Indonesian student living in Manchester is arrested on one count of rape. Later investigations reveal him to be the most prolific rapist in British legal history, having drug-raped up to 200 men.
14 June – Grenfell Tower fire
24 November – A sixteen-year-old girl who admitted the manslaughter seven year old Katie Rough in York is detained for life and ordered to serve a minimum term of five years.

Deaths

12 January
Anthony King, 82, professor and political scientist.
Graham Taylor, 72, football manager (Watford, Aston Villa, England).

See also
2017 in Northern Ireland
2017 in Scotland
2017 in Wales

References

 
England
2010s in England
Years of the 21st century in England